Alterna is the fifth studio album by Japanese rock band Rize.

Track listing
All tracks by Rize

 "" – 3:24
 "American Hero" – 2:47
 "" – 2:35
 "" – 4:31 (hide cover)
 "" – 3:04
 "Feeling" – 3:20
 ""
 "Ghost" – 2:55
 "28" – 2:54
 "124℃" – 2:31

Personnel 

 Jesse McFaddin – MC & guitar
 Kaneko Nobuaki – drums
 KenKen –  bass
 Nakao Yoshihiro – guitar

References

Rize (band) albums
2007 albums